Saint Andrew's Episcopal Church is a historic Episcopal church at 217 West Twenty-sixth in Bryan, Texas.

The Late Gothic Revival-style church building was constructed in 1914 and added to the National Register of Historic Places in 1987.

See also

National Register of Historic Places listings in Brazos County, Texas

References

External links

Official website

Churches completed in 1914
20th-century Episcopal church buildings
Episcopal churches in Texas
Churches on the National Register of Historic Places in Texas
Gothic Revival church buildings in Texas
Churches in Brazos County, Texas
Bryan, Texas
National Register of Historic Places in Brazos County, Texas
1914 establishments in Texas